Andrew Russell (born 30 March 1993) is a Scottish footballer.

He has previously played for Livingston, Cowdenbeath, Berwick Rangers , East Stirlingshire and Bathgate Thistle on loan.

Career

Livingston
A member of Livingston's under 19 squad Russell made his first team debut on 5 November 2011 against Falkirk in the Scottish First Division. During the 2012–13 season, he spent time on loan at Bathgate Thistle. Russell left Livingston in May 2013.

Cowdenbeath
On 6 July 2013, Russell signed for Cowdenbeath. During his time at the club he played 16 times, but failed to score.

Berwick Rangers
After being released by Cowdenbeath, Russell signed for Scottish League Two club Berwick Rangers. On 12 April 2014, he scored his first senior career goal in Berwick's 3–1 win against Elgin City. Russell was released by Berwick in January 2016, having only made 12 appearances for the side during the 2015–16 season.

East Stirlingshire
After leaving Shielfield Park, Russell signed for Scottish League Two relegation rivals East Stirlingshire until the end of the season, with his first match for the side coming in a 3–0 home defeat to Arbroath.

Career statistics

References

External links

1993 births
Living people
Association football forwards
Scottish Football League players
Livingston F.C. players
Scottish footballers
Clyde F.C. players
Cowdenbeath F.C. players
Berwick Rangers F.C. players
East Stirlingshire F.C. players
Scottish Professional Football League players